The 2008–09 Women's CEV Cup was the 37th edition of the European Women's CEV Cup volleyball club tournament, the former Top Teams Cup.

Teams of the 2008–2009
The number of participants on the basis of ranking list for European Cup Competitions

Play-off

1/16 Finals
1st leg  4–6 November 2008
2nd leg 11–13 November 2008
The 16 winning teams from the 1/16 Finals will compete in the 1/8 Finals playing Home & Away
matches. The losers of the 1/16 Final matches will qualify for the 3rd round of the Challenge Cup.

1/8 Finals
1st leg  9–11 December 2008
2nd leg 16–18 December 2008

1/4 Finals
1st leg  13–14 January 2009
2nd leg 20–21 January 2009

Final four
Novara, 14 & 15 March 2009

Semi-finals
March 14, 2009

|}

3rd Place
March 15, 2009

|}

Final
March 15, 2009

|}

Awards
Winners:
MVP:  Cristina Barcellini (Asystel Novara)
Best Scorer:  Seda Tokatlıoğlu (Fenerbahçe Acıbadem)
Best Server:  Maria Duskryadchenko (Uralochka-NTMK Yekaterinburg)
Best Spiker:  Katja Wühler (Rote Raben Vilsbiburg)
Best Blocker:  Kun Feng (Asystel Novara)
Best Setter:  Kun Feng (Asystel Novara)
Best Receiver:  Valeriya Korotenko (Fenerbahçe Acıbadem)

References

External links
 CEV Cup 08-09

2008-09
CEV Cup
CEV Cup